Manolis Patemtzis (born 22 April 1964) is a retired Greek football defender and later manager.

References

1964 births
Living people
Greek footballers
Irodotos FC players
OFI Crete F.C. players
Olympiacos Volos F.C. players
Super League Greece players
Association football defenders
Greek football managers
Irodotos FC managers
Ergotelis F.C. managers
Ermis Zoniana F.C. managers
People from Heraklion